The 2003–04 First League of the Federation of Bosnia and Herzegovina season was the fourth since its establishment.

League standings

External links
 Futbol24.com
 RSSSF.org

First League of the Federation of Bosnia and Herzegovina seasons
Bosnia
2003–04 in Bosnia and Herzegovina football